"I'll Be Around"  is a song recorded by the American R&B vocal group The Spinners (known as "Detroit Spinners" in the UK). It was co-written by Thom Bell and Phil Hurtt and produced by Bell.

Recorded at Philadelphia's Sigma Sound Studios, the house band MFSB provided the backing.  The production of the song gives it a smooth, mid-tempo feel, with the signature guitar riff (in octaves) played by Norman Harris at the forefront and punctuation from female background singers, the MFSB horns & strings and conga-playing from Larry Washington. Bobby Smith handles lead vocals on the song.

The song was included on the group's 1973 self-titled album on Atlantic Records, their first album release for the label. It was initially released as the B-side of the group's first single on Atlantic Records, with "How Could I Let You Get Away" being the A-side. Radio deejays, however, soon opted for "I'll Be Around" which led to Atlantic flipping the single over and the song became an unexpected hit, eventually spending five weeks at No.1 on the  U.S. R&B chart (the group's first No.1 on the R&B chart), and reaching No.3 on the U.S. Pop chart in the fall of 1972. It also reached sales of over one million copies, The Spinners' first record ever to do so. The success of "I'll Be Around" would be the first in a series of chart successes The Spinners and Bell would have together during the 1970s.

Personnel

 Lead vocals by Bobby Smith
 Background vocals by Bobby Smith, Philippé Wynne, Pervis Jackson, Henry Fambrough and Billy Henderson
 Additional Background vocals by Linda Creed and the Sigma Sweethearts (Barbara Ingram, Carla Benson, and Evette Benton)
 Instrumentation by MFSB
 The signature bassline which underpins the song is played by Ronnie Baker

Cover versions

"I'll Be Around" has been covered by many artists.  Among them are The Moments, The Afghan Whigs, Devon Allman, Joan Osborne, The Rippingtons featuring Jeffrey Osborne, Funk, Inc., Doug Parkinson, Richie Kotzen and Hall & Oates, whose version reached No.6 on the U.S. Adult Contemporary chart.

The song was sampled in the 1973 break-in record, "Super Fly Meets Shaft" (US #31).

Jamaican reggae artist Otis Gayle also recorded a rocksteady version of "I'll Be Around" for the Studio One label in the early 1970s, that features the recognizable organ playing of Jackie Mittoo. Like many Jamaican recordings, the instrumental track for this song went on to be the foundation for many Jamaican singles to this day, notably Johnny Osbournes 1979 hit We Need Love.

US singer Terri Wells had a hit in 1984 with her version, which reached No.17 in the UK Singles Chart.

In 1985, a cover by the American new wave group What Is This?, produced by Todd Rundgren, reached No. 62 on the Billboard Hot 100.

In 1995, rapper Rappin' 4-Tay released his own version of the song as the second single from his second album. This rendition replaced the song's original lyrics with those written by Rappin' 4-Tay, though it sampled the original and retained the chorus, for which The Spinners were credited as featured artists. It became a top-40 hit in the United States, peaking at No.39 on the Billboard Hot 100. Also that same year, the Spinners' original version was featured in the film Dead Presidents.

In 1999, rap group TRU, featuring Master P sampled it on their single "Tru Homies", from their album Da Crime Family. "Tru Homies" peaked at No.6 on the Hot Rap Singles and No.61 on the Hot R&B/Hip-Hop Singles & Tracks.

In 2015, the German group, Hotlane (Agnes Lindström & Jack Tennis) sampled "I'll Be Around" on the song "Whenever", featured on their first album titled "The EP".

Chart performance
The Spinners

Weekly charts

Hall & Oates version

Year-end charts

See also
R&B number-one hits of 1972 (USA)
List of number-one R&B hits (United States)

Notes

References
 A House on Fire: The Rise and Fall of Philadelphia Soul by John A. Jackson,  (Publication: New York Oxford University Press (U.S.), 2004)
 "I'll Be Around" [ song review] on Allmusic website

1972 singles
1995 singles
The Spinners (American group) songs
Songs written by Thom Bell
Torch songs
1972 songs
Atlantic Records singles
Cashbox number-one singles